Lukas Lekavičius (born March 30, 1994) is a Lithuanian professional basketball player for Žalgiris Kaunas of the Lithuanian Basketball League (LKL) and the EuroLeague. He was named to the LKL All-Tournament Team in 2017.

Professional career
After spending his whole career in the Žalgiris Kaunas system, helping Žalgiris dominate the LKL scene, Lekavičius joined Panathinaikos, on a two-year contract, in 2017. He was personally chosen by the Panathinaikos head coach, Xavi Pascual, who had previously observed Lekavičius playing for a couple of years. Lekavičius chose the number 19 for his Panathinaikos jersey, which was previously used in the same club by Lithuanian players Robertas Javtokas, Ramūnas Šiškauskas, Jonas Mačiulis and Lekavičius' former coach Šarūnas Jasikevičius.

After spending two years in Greece, Lekavičius returned to Lithuania and signed with Žalgiris on a two-year (1+1) deal on 17 June 2019. He averaged 10.5 points and 2.8 assists per game. He re-signed with the club on 8 July 2020.

National team career
Lekavičius had notable performances with the Lithuania youth national teams, winning two European silver medals, and the world bronze medal in 2013. In 2015, Lekavičius was included into the senior Lithuania men's national basketball team candidates list, by the team's head coach, Jonas Kazlauskas. He was also invited to the team's training camp, and he then made it onto the main national team that competed at the EuroBasket 2015, where he won a silver medal. In 2017, just before the start of the EuroBasket 2017 championship, Lekavičius suffered a foot injury that ultimately sidelined him for two months, and was replaced in the final 12-man squad by Adas Juškevičius.

In 2019, Lekavičius represented Lithuania in the 2019 FIBA Basketball World Cup. Despite the team falling short of its goals, he was a crucial asset, providing scoring off the bench as the backup point guard. In five games played, he averaged 13.0 points, with 65% overall shooting, 1.8 assists, 1.0 steals and 13.4 point efficiency rating in just 17.7 minutes of playing time.

Personal life
Lekavičius' has a couple of nicknames. His first nickname, Lightning McQueen (Žaibas Makvynas), was given to him by the Lithuanian TV broadcast commentator, and Lithuania national team staff representative, Linas Kunigėlis. His second nickname, Lithuanian Isaiah Thomas, was given to him by the Lithuanian sports media, because of his similarities to Isaiah Thomas' (Thomas' height is 5'9", and Lekavičius' height is 5'10". They are both left-handed, and at one time, both of their club team's main colors were green and white).

Career statistics

EuroLeague

|-
| style="text-align:left;"| 2014–15
| style="text-align:left;"rowspan=3| Žalgiris
| 24 || 7 || 18.9 || .417 || .333 || .778 || 1.8 || 2.7 || .4 || .0 || 5.5 || 5.1
|-
| style="text-align:left;"| 2015–16
| 21 || 3 || 14.3 || .418 || .516 || .737 || 1.1 || 1.3 || .9 || .0 || 4.6 || 3.4
|-
| style="text-align:left;"| 2016–17
| 30 || 0 || 18.1 || .448 || .338 || .759 || 1.9 || 3.5 || .6 || .0 || 8.5 || 8.8
|-
| style="text-align:left;"| 2017–18
| style="text-align:left;" rowspan=2| Panathinaikos
| 31 || 3 || 12.6 || .473 || .486 || .895 || 1.0 || 1.5 || .2 || .0 || 3.9 || 4.5
|-
| style="text-align:left;"| 2018–19
| 33 || 0 || 10.8 || .423 || .405 || .786 || .8 || 1.3 || .3 || .0 || 4.0 || 3.9
|-
| style="text-align:left;"| 2019–20
| style="text-align:left;"rowspan=3| Žalgiris
| 27 || 3 || 19.9 || .535 || .392 || .862 || 1.3 || 2.8 || .5 || .0 || 10.5 || 10.2
|-
| style="text-align:left;"| 2020–21
| 33 || 0 || 18.3 || .550 || .500 || .864 || 1.2 || 2.4 || .5 || .0 || 8.2 || 8.3
|-
| style="text-align:left;"| 2021–22
| 32 || 5 || 23.7 || .439 || .431 || .878 || 1.3 || 4.2 || .7 || .0 || 10.2 || 10.9
|- class="sortbottom"
| style="text-align:center"; colspan="2"| Career
| 232 || 21 || 17.1 || .470 || .397 || .830 || 1.3 || 2.5 || .5 || .0 || 7.0 || 7.1

References

External links
 Lukas Lekavičius at eurobasket.com
 Lukas Lekavičius at euroleague.net (archive)
 Lukas Lekavičius at euroleaguebasketball.net
 Lukas Lekavicius at fiba.com
 Lukas Lekavičius at realgm.com

1994 births
Living people
BC Žalgiris players
BC Žalgiris-2 players
Lithuanian expatriate basketball people in Greece
Lithuanian men's basketball players
Panathinaikos B.C. players
People from Šilalė
Point guards
2019 FIBA Basketball World Cup players